Marnaviridae is a family of positive-stranded RNA viruses in the order Picornavirales that infect various photosynthetic marine protists. Members of the family have non-enveloped, icosahedral capsids. Replication occurs in the cytoplasm and causes lysis of the host cell. The first species of this family that was isolated is Heterosigma akashiwo RNA virus (HaRNAV) in the genus Marnavirus, that infects the toxic bloom-forming Raphidophyte alga, Heterosigma akashiwo. As of 2021, there are 20 species across 7 genera in this family, as well as many other related viruses discovered through metagenomic sequencing that are currently unclassified  

HaRNAV was isolated from water collected in the Strait of Georgia in British Columbia, Canada, from a concentrated virus assemblage using the host Heterosigma akashiwo (NEPCC 522). It must not be confused with two other unrelated viruses that infect this host, Heterosigma akashiwo virus 01 (HaV-1, isolate: HaV53) in the genus Raphidovirus, and Heterosigma akashiwo Nuclear Inclusion Virus (HaNIV).

Discovery 
Marnaviridae had initially existed for multiple years prior with Marnavirus as the only genus and HaRNAV as the only species. After the usage metagenomic analysis on the amino acid sequences of the capsid proteins and RdRp domains on viruses under the order  Picornavirales, Marnaviridae was discovered to have a larger variety of viruses classified under it. Previously unassigned Labyrnavirus and Bacillarnavirus were classified as Marnaviridae.

Taxonomy
The family contains the following seven genera designated based on analysis of RNA-dependent RNA polymerase (RdRp) sequences, species are listed under each genus.

Genus: Bacillarnavirus
 Chaetoceros socialis forma radians RNA virus 1
 Chaetoceros tenuissimus RNA virus 01
 Rhizosolenia setigera RNA virus 01

Genus: Kusarnavirus
 Astarnavirus

Genus: Labyrnavirus
 Aurantiochytrium single-strand RNA virus 01

Genus: Locarnavirus
 Jericarnavirus B
 Sanfarnavirus 1
 Sanfarnavirus 2
 Sanfarnavirus 3

Genus: Marnavirus
 Heterosigma akashiwo RNA virus

Genus: Salisharnavirus
 Britarnavirus 1
 Britarnavirus 4
 Palmarnavirus 128
 Palmarnavirus 473

Genus: Sogarnavirus
 Britarnavirus 2
 Britarnavirus 3
 Chaetarnavirus 2
 Chaetenuissarnavirus II
 Jericarnavirus A
 Palmarnavirus 156

Structure 

Virions in Marnaviridae are non-enveloped, with icosahedral geometries, and T=pseudo3 symmetry. Virus particles are 22-35 nm in diameter. The capsid consists of three major capsid proteins (MCPs: VP1, VP2, VP3), each having a Jelly roll fold. Most species also encode a minor capsid protein (mCP: VP4). All VPs are composed of β-sheets and α-helices. that is located around the five-fold axes on the inside of the capsid. 

The structures of Chaetoceros socialis forma radians RNA virus 1 (CsfrRNAV01, Bacillarnavirus) and Chaetoceros tenuissimus RNA virus type II (CtenRNAVII, Sogarnavirus) have been determined. In both species, VP1 surrounds the five-fold axes while VP2 and VP3 form the two- and three-fold axes. The jelly roll folds on the MCPs are non-canonical with VP1 having 9 β-strands and VP2 and VP3 having seven. VP1 also contains a unique EF-loop connected to the extra β-strand in the jelly roll fold which portrudes from the surface of the virus particle. A CD-loop is also present on VP1 which obscures the canyon structure that binds host receptors in the related Picornaviridae family. Unlike other species, VP4 is not present in the CsfrRNAV01 capsid, although the corresponding gene still exists.

Genome 
Marnaviridae genomes consist of linear, non-segmented, positive-sense single-stranded RNA 8.6-9.6 kb in length. The genomic RNA contains either one or two open-reading frames (ORFs) that may overlap. For species whose genomes have two ORFs, one encodes proteins involved in replication while the other encodes structural proteins. Genomes also contain internal ribosome entry sites in intergenic regions and on the 5' end. The 3' end of the genome contains a poly(A) tail.

Among the species, monocistronic and dicistronic organizations of the genome are found, with a majority of the viruses being dicistronic.

Replication 
Viral replication in Marnaviridae is cytoplasmic and cytolytic. After a latent period between 8-48 hours, the virus hosts are observed to experience cytopathic symptoms. These symptoms are characterized by swelling of the endoplasmic reticulum, formation of vacuoles, appearance of fibrous matter in vacuolated parts of the cell, and the deterioration of the cytoplasm.

Life cycle
Various marine phyoplankton species serve as hosts for members of the family Marnaviridae. Entry into the host cell is achieved by penetration into the host cell. EF-, CD-, and E1E2-loops are hypothesized to interact with host receptors to trigger viral entry. Replication occurs in the cytoplasm and relies on the viral RdRp. The positive-sense RNA genome is directly translated to produce viral proteins. Virus particles accumulate in the cytoplasm and may form crystalline arrays. The virus then exits the host cell by tubule-guided viral movement and virions are released by cell lysis. Burst sizes differ greatly between species and range from 66 to 106.

Latent perioods for viral infection varies by species, and ranges from 8-48 hours. Infected cells are lysed shortly after showing signs of infection, causing proportions of infected cells to remain low.

Host Interactions

Marnavirus

Heterosigma akashiwo RNA virus (HaRNAV) 
HaRNAV is the first identified virus in the Marnaviridae family. When the virus infects Heterosigma akashiwo, a toxic bloom-forming alga, it replicates inside the cytoplasm of its host, and is distributed either singly or in groups as crystalline arrays. Within those that are aligned in crystalline arrays, sectioned particles show that they are either packaged completely (electron dense), or incompletely (ring-shaped). Once infected, the host cells exhibit symptoms such as swelling of the endoplasmic reticulum, disintegration and vacuolation of the cytoplasm, as well as fibrous material appearing in those vacuolated areas. HaRNAV is known to be able to infect multiple strains of H. akashiwo in the Pacific Ocean, namely 3 strains (NEPCC 102, NEPCC 522, NEPCC 764) from the Northeast Pacific region, and 2 strains (H93616, H94608) from Japan. It is noted that HaRNAV infect different strains of H. akashiwo when compared to other viruses, suggesting a co-existence with other H. akashiwo viruses, each having a slightly different host range. H. akashiwo cells also demonstrate more viral resistance after its bloom has collapsed, suggesting that the H. akashiwo strains may change over the course of the algal bloom, which is regulated by the viruses.

Bacillarnavirus

Chaetoceros tenuissimus RNA virus 01 
CtenRNAV01 infects the bloom-forming diatom Chaetoceros tenussimus Meunier. I was first isolated from strain 2-10 but is able to infect other strains of the same species. Host cells in stationary phase are more susceptible to the virus than logarithmic phase cells. Host susceptibility is also affected by temperature, with various strains being more susceptible at temperatures above 20ºC. Strain 2-10, however, is more susceptible below 20ºC which is not optimal for host growth. Iron-limitation has also been shown to reduce viral infection rates. Stationary phase infection and virus-induced lysis of host cells is also impaired by bacteria of the genera Nautella, Polaribacter, and Sulitobacter that coexist with the host diatom in the marine environment. This is thought to be a mechanism allowing for susceptible diatom species to survive viral infections.

Sogarnavirus

Chaetoceros tenuissimus RNA virus type II 
Like CtenRNAV01, CtenRNAVII was first isolated from Chaetoceros tenussimus Meunier strain 2-10, however it is also able to infect at least 4 other Chaetoceros species. It is the only Marnaviridae species identified thus far that has demonstrated this broad of a host range.

Prevalence in Aquaculture

References

External links 
 Viralzone: Marnaviridae
 ICTV
 NCBI: Marnaviridae (family)
 ICTV: Taxonomy History – Marnaviridae

Picornavirales
Virus families